Potcoava is a town in Olt County, Muntenia, Romania. The town administers four villages: Potcoava-Fălcoeni, Sinești, Trufinești and Valea Merilor.

At the 2011 census, Potcoava had a population of 5,743 people. Of those, 87.65% were Romanians and 7.23% Roma.

Natives
 Marian Anghelina (born 1991), footballer
 Lina Ciobanu (born 1929), communist politician

References

Populated places in Olt County
Localities in Muntenia
Towns in Romania